The Sudan Khartoum Refinery Company is a petroleum company in Sudan.  The company its name is abbreviated to KRC.  The company was founded in 1997 and began operations in 2000.  KRC is based in Khartoum.

Ownership
The company is 50% owned by the Sudanese government's Ministry of Energy & Mining (MEM) and 50% owned by the China National Petroleum Corporation (CNPC)..

Operations
The company operates an oil refinery 70 kilometers north of Khartoum.  The capacity of the refinery is 100,000 barrels of oil per day.

Khartoum refineries is also known as alGayley  refineries alone was able to fulfill the entire needs of Sudan making it self-sufficient from petroleum by-products. 
Excess petroleum is exported from Bashair Port on the Red Sea through a pipeline of 1610 km length, making it the longest pipeline in Africa.

External links
 Sudan Khartoum Refinery Company official site
 Sudan Khartoum Refinery Company page at MBendi

Oil and gas companies of Sudan
Oil refineries in Sudan
Companies based in Khartoum
Energy companies established in 1997
Non-renewable resource companies established in 1997
1997 establishments in Sudan